David McGillivray may refer to:

David McGillivray (screenwriter) (born 1947), actor, producer, screenwriter and film critic
David McGillivray (figure skater) (born 1949), Canadian figure skater
Dave McGillivray, American race director; current director of the Boston Marathon